Melkevatnet is a lake in Narvik Municipality in Nordland county, Norway. The  lake is located between the Efjorden and the lake Hjertvatnet.

See also
List of lakes in Norway

References

Ballangen
Lakes of Nordland